The 2001 Rhode Island Rams football team was an American football team that represented the University of Rhode Island in the Atlantic 10 Conference during the 2001 NCAA Division I-AA football season. In their second season under head coach Tim Stowers, the Rams compiled an 8–3 record (6–3 against conference opponents) and finished fifth out of eleven teams in the conference.

Schedule

References

Rhode Island
Rhode Island Rams football seasons
Rhode Island Rams football